Melese flavescens is a moth of the family Erebidae. It was described by James John Joicey and George Talbot in 1918. It is found in Argentina.

References

 

Melese
Moths described in 1918